Doktor Mugg is a Swedish television series, named after the program's title character. The series takes place in the fictitious town Dasseborg (Outhouseburg) and revolves around toilet humor, mugg and dass being colloquial terms for toilet in the Swedish language. Other important main characters are Kapten Filling (Captain Skivvies) and Walter Closett. 

The series has been shown on Sweden's TV4 a number of times, as a part of children's programming. It has also been released on DVD.

Story

Doktor Mugg is a man dressed in a black suit and has a toilet ring around his head. He is a formerly employed researcher in Dasseborg's toilet factory (which is controlled by the most powerful man in Dasseborg, Walter Closett). Doktor Mugg tries to force the citizens to buy his invention "Pruttomobilen" ("The Fartmobile"), a mobile toilet, for 85,000 Swedish krona. To make people buy his invention, he implements various devilish schemes, such as blocking people's toilet seats. However, he is always stopped by Kapten Filling, a not-so-smart superhero that in real life owns a small laundry.

PC game 

There was a PC game based on the story released in 2003.

Cast
 Markoolio- Doktor Mugg
 Johan Petersson-Kapten Filling/Klas Kent
 Örjan Hamrin-Walter Closett
 Bengt Carlsson-Kommissarie Nödig
 Michaela de la Cour-Jenny Knip
 Vanna Rosenberg-Bajamaja
 Fredde Granberg-Reporterbröderna
 Tobias G. Kronkvist-Herr Rumplund
 Lisa Persson-The Other Voices

References 

Swedish children's television series